Guy Barrabino (17 January 1934 – 10 November 2017) was a French fencer. He competed in the team foil event at the 1960 Summer Olympics.

References

External links
 

1934 births
2017 deaths
French male foil fencers
Olympic fencers of France
Fencers at the 1960 Summer Olympics
Universiade medalists in fencing
Universiade gold medalists for France
Medalists at the 1959 Summer Universiade